The 1976–77 Australian region cyclone season was a slightly above average tropical cyclone season.

Systems

Tropical Cyclone Harry

Harry formed on 15 December near the Sunda Strait, and moved west-southwest through its existence.  Its maximum intensity was reached as the cyclone passed north of the Cocos-Keeling Islands. The system then weakened and dissipated well east of Madagascar.

Severe Tropical Cyclone Ted

Ted made landfall in Queensland on 19 December 1976. The storm killed 2 people and left $49 million in damage.

Severe Tropical Cyclone Irene

Tropical Cyclone June

Tropical Cyclone Keith

Tropical Cyclone Lily

Tropical Cyclone Miles

Tropical Cyclone Nancy

Severe Tropical Cyclone Jack-Io

Severe Tropical Cyclone Karen

Tropical Cyclone Otto

Otto made landfall near Bowen, Queensland in March 1977. The storm caused minimal wind damage but caused extensive beach erosion.

Severe Tropical Cyclone Leo

Leo affected Port Hedland around March 1977.

Severe Tropical Cyclone Verna

See also

Atlantic hurricane seasons: 1976, 1977
Eastern Pacific hurricane seasons: 1976, 1977
Western Pacific typhoon seasons: 1976, 1977
North Indian Ocean cyclone seasons: 1976, 1977

References

Australian region cyclone seasons
Aust
 disasters in Australia
 disasters in Australia
 disasters in Oceania
 disasters in Oceania